Guelatao metro station is a Mexico City Metro station in the Iztapalapa borough of Mexico City. It is an at-grade station that serves Line A (the Purple Line) between Tepalcates and Peñón Viejo stations.

The station services the colonias (neighborhoods) of Ejército de Oriente and Voceadores. The station's pictogram depicts the sculpture on top of the Museo Cabeza de Juárez, found near the station, which in turn depicts the head of Benito Juárez, the 26th president of Mexico, who was born in the town of San Pablo Guelatao, Guelatao Municipality, Oaxaca. Guelatao metro station opened on 12 August 1991 with service westward toward Pantitlán station and eastward toward La Paz metro station. In 2019, the station had an average daily entrance of 21,639 passengers.

Location

Guelatao is a metro station along Calzada Ignacio Zaragoza, in eastern Mexico City. The station serves the colonias (Mexican Spanish for "neighborhoods") of Ejército de Oriente and Voceadores in Iztapalapa. Within the system, the station lies between Tepalcates and Peñón Viejo metro stations. The area is serviced by Route 9-D of the city's public bus system and by Routes 162-B, 163, 163-A, 163-B, 164, 166, and 167 of the Red de Transporte de Pasajeros network.

Exits
There are two exits:
North: Calzada Ignacio Zaragoza and General Miguel Lira y Ortega Street, Voceadores.
South: Calzada Ignacio Zaragoza and Batallón de la Zacapoaxtla Street, Ejército de Oriente.

History and construction
Line A of the Mexico City Metro was built by Empresas ICA. The line was opened on 12 August 1991, operating westward towards Pantitlán station and eastward towards La Paz station, located in the municipality of the same name of the State of Mexico. The station's 
pictogram features the sculpture found on top of the Museo Cabeza de Juárez, a nearby museum, which in turn depicts the head of Benito Juárez, the president of Mexico from 1858 to 1872. Juárez himself was born in the town of San Pablo Guelatao, in Guelatao Municipality, Oaxaca. The word  means "enchanted lagoon" in Zapotec.

Ridership
According to the data provided by the authorities since the 2000s, commuters have averaged per year between 10,500 and 24,300  daily entrances in the last decade, In 2019, before the impact of the COVID-19 pandemic on public transport, the station's ridership totaled 7,898,506 passengers, which was an increase of 1,046,065 passengers compared to 2018. In the same year, Guelatao metro station was the 78th busiest station of the system's 195 stations, and it was the line's fourth busiest.

Gallery

Notes

References

External links
 
 

1991 establishments in Mexico
Cultural depictions of Benito Juárez
Mexico City Metro Line A stations
Mexico City Metro stations in Iztapalapa
Railway stations opened in 1991